General Smart may refer to:

Edward Smart (1891–1961), Australian Army lieutenant general
Jacob E. Smart (1909–2006), U.S. Army general
Tracy Smart (fl. 1980s–2010s), Royal Australian Air Force Surgeon General